The canton of Châlons-en-Champagne-2 is an administrative division of the Marne department, northeastern France. Its borders were modified at the French canton reorganisation which came into effect in March 2015. Its seat is in Châlons-en-Champagne.

It consists of the following communes:
 
Aigny
Aulnay-sur-Marne
Châlons-en-Champagne (partly)
Champigneul-Champagne
Cherville
Condé-sur-Marne
Les Grandes-Loges
Isse
Jâlons
Juvigny
Matougues
Recy
Saint-Gibrien
Saint-Martin-sur-le-Pré
Saint-Pierre
Thibie
La Veuve
Villers-le-Château
Vraux

References

Cantons of Marne (department)